A Zamenhof-Esperanto object (ZEO) is a monument or place linked to L. L. Zamenhof, to the constructed language Esperanto that he created and first published in 1887, or to the community of Esperanto speakers which has been using the language since.

History of Zamenhof-Esperanto objects and their registration 

The first Zamenhof-Esperanto object was the ship Esperanto, constructed and launched in Spain in 1896, nine years after the language's birth. The 1934 Encyclopedia of Esperanto listed approximately 50 towns and cities in which Esperanto or Zamenhof have been honored. In 1997, a German Esperantist, Hugo Röllinger, published a book titled Monumente pri Esperanto – ilustrita dokumentaro pri 1044 Zamenhof/Esperanto-objektoj en 54 landoj ("Monumentally about Esperanto – an illustrated documentary of 1,044 Zamenhof-Esperanto objects in 54 countries") and until his death in 2001 he listed a total of 1,260 such objects. It is he who coined the acronym ZEO. Currently, Robert Kamiński of Poland is the person charged with the registration of ZEOs by the Universal Esperanto Association.

Notable Zamenhof-Esperanto objects 

Tallest
At 12 meters, the Zamenhof monument in Sabadell, Spain, dating from 1989
Longest
At 4 kilometers, Esperanto Street in São Sebastião do Caí, Brazil
Northernmost
A monument to Esperanto in Narvik, Norway, at 68°25' N
Esperanto Creek in Alaska, United States, at 63°27' N
Cape Esperanto, Svalbard, Norway, at 78°37' N
Southernmost
Esperanto tree in Tasmania, Australia, at 42° S
Zamenhof monument and Esperanto Street in Mar del Plata, Argentina
Zamenhof street in Port Elizabeth, South Africa
Esperanto Island, Antarctica, at 62°25'43" S
Most remote
The asteroids 1462 Zamenhof and 1421 Esperanto
An inscription in Esperanto carried by the Voyager 1 and Voyager 2 spacecraft on their journey out of the Solar System

See also 
 Esperanto culture

References

External links 

 List of ZEOs recorded in Röllinger's 1997 book
 List and images of postal stamps on the topic of Esperanto
 Information about ships named after Esperanto and Zamenhof

Esperanto culture
Zamenhof

hu:Eszperantáliák